The 2019 Prince Edward Island general election was held to elect the members of the 66th General Assembly of Prince Edward Island. The vote in 26 of the 27 districts was held on 23 April 2019, while the vote for the member from Charlottetown-Hillsborough Park was deferred to 15 July due to the death of the Green Party's candidate. However, Charlottetown-Hillsborough Park still voted in a referendum on electoral reform. Natalie Jameson won the deferred election in the riding.

The Progressive Conservatives under new leader Dennis King won thirteen seats (including deferred seat) to form a minority government. The Greens under leader Peter Bevan-Baker won eight seats to form the Opposition. The Liberals under Premier Wade MacLauchlan were reduced to six seats and MacLauchlan lost in his own district. The Progressive Conservatives' share of the popular vote was steady at 37%, the Green Party enjoyed a 20 point increase to 31%, and the Liberals' share dropped 11 points to 30%. The Greens won several seats in or near the two cities of Charlottetown and Summerside, while the Progressive Conservatives took several more rural seats from the Liberals.

A referendum on electoral reform that asked Islanders if they wished to adopt a mixed-member proportional representation voting system was held in conjunction with the election. The initiative failed to pass in at least 60% of the districts as required under provincial legislation to proceed so the province did not change from the First Past the post system in subsequent elections. As well, the Island-wide popular vote showed about 51% of voters voted to stay with the current first-past-the-post voting system while about 49% voted for the proposed change. 

The election was the first time since the 1890 Prince Edward Island general election that the province elected a minority government, the first time in the province's history that a significant number of voters turned to a third party besides the dominant Liberals and Progressive Conservatives, and the first time that a Green Party reached official opposition status in any Canadian provincial legislature.

Background
Under the provisions of the Prince Edward Island Elections Act, an election was required by the fixed date of 7 October 2019, unless it was called earlier. After months of speculation of an early election call, Premier Wade MacLauchlan announced the election at a rally on 26 March.

In the previous election, on 4 May 2015, the Liberal Party, led by Premier Wade MacLauchlan, was re-elected to a majority government, earning election in 18 out of the 27 ridings (and down 2 from their pre-election total). The official opposition Progressive Conservatives, under leader Rob Lantz, increased its seat count from 3 before the election to 8, despite Lantz losing in Charlottetown-Brighton. Meanwhile, the Green Party, under leader Peter Bevan-Baker, won its first ever seat, Bevan-Baker's, in Kellys Cross-Cumberland. The NDP were unable to win a seat, continuing their streak of being shut out of the legislature since 2000.

Despite the increase in the Progressive Conservatives' seat count, on 23 September of that year, Lantz stepped down as leader. Since Lantz's departure, The Progressive Conservatives held two leadership elections: one on 20 October 2017, selecting MLA James Aylward as their leader; and again on 9 February 2019, choosing Dennis King as their new leader following Aylward's announcement on 27 September 2018 his intention to resign when his successor was chosen.

Historical results from 1993 onwards

Results

Source : electionspei.ca

|-
!rowspan="2" colspan="2" align=left|Party
!rowspan="2" align=left|Party leader
!rowspan="2"|Candidates
!colspan="4" align=center|Seats
!colspan="3" style="text-align:center;"|Popular vote
|-
!align="center"|2015
!align="center"|Dissol.
!align="center"|2019
! style="text-align:center;"|Change
! style="text-align:center;"|#
! style="text-align:center;"|%
! style="text-align:center;"|Change

|align=left|Dennis King
|align="right"|27
|align="right"|8
|align="right"|8
|align="right"|13
|align="right"| +5
|align="right"|30,415
|align="right"|36.73
|align="right"|–0.66

|align=left|Peter Bevan-Baker
|align="right"|27
|align="right"|1
|align="right"|2
|align="right"|8
|align="right"| +7
|align="right"|25,302
|align="right"|30.55
|align="right"|+19.74

|align=left|Wade MacLauchlan
|align="right"|27
|align="right"|18
|align="right"|16
|align="right"|6
|align="right"| –12
|align="right"|24,346
|align="right"|29.41
|align="right"|–11.42

|align=left|Joe Byrne
|align="right"|24
|align="right"|0
|align="right"|0
|align="right"|0
|align="right"|–
|align="right"|2,454
|align="right"|2.96
|align="right"|–8.01

|colspan="2" align="left"|Independent
|align="right"|3
|align="right"|0
|align="right"|1
|align="right"|0
|align="right"|-
|align="right"|282
|align="right"|0.34
|align="right"|+0.34
|-
!colspan="11"|
|-
|colspan="8" align=left|Blank and invalid ballots
|align="right"|386
|align="right"|0.46
|align="right"|
|-
| style="text-align:left;" colspan="3"|Total
| style="text-align:right;"|108
| style="text-align:right;"|27
| style="text-align:right;"|27
| style="text-align:right;"|27
| style="text-align:right;"|
| style="text-align:right;"|83,185
| style="text-align:right;"|100
| style="text-align:right;"|
|-
|colspan="8" align=left|Registered voters / turnout
|align="right"|107,109
|align="right"|77.66
|align="right"|
|}

Synopsis of results

 = open seat
 = turnout is above provincial average
 = incumbent re-elected in same riding
 = previously incumbent in another riding
 = other incumbent renominated

Results by region

Detailed analysis

Timeline

2015
 4 May – The Liberal Party, led by Premier Wade MacLauchlan, wins a majority government and the Progressive Conservative Party forms the opposition. The Green Party, under leader Peter Bevan-Baker, wins its first ever seat, with Bevan-Baker winning Kellys Cross-Cumberland.
 23 September – Progressive Conservative leader Rob Lantz resigns, effective that day.
 15 October – Jamie Fox, MLA for Borden-Kinkora, is chosen as the Progressive Conservative interim leader, defeating opponent Darlene Compton.

2016
 1 August – Liberal MLA for Summerside-Wilmot Janice Sherry resigns her seat.
 17 October – Chris Palmer is elected in the Summerside-Wilmot by-election, retaining the seat for the Liberals.
 27 October – Voting for the 2016 Plebiscite on Democratic Renewal, a non-binding referendum on changing the electoral system, begins.
 7 November – Voting in the 2016 Plebiscite on Democratic Renewal ends, indicating mixed member proportional representation as the preferred choice for electing MLAs.
 22 November – The Legislative Assembly does not adopt the Plebiscite on Democratic Renewal's results and instead approves a motion to hold a second referendum at the next provincial election.

2017
19 October – Liberal MLA for Charlottetown-Parkdale Doug Currie resigns his seat.
20 October – James Aylward, MLA for Stratford-Kinlock, is chosen as the Progressive Conservative leader, defeating opponent Brad Trivers.
27 November – Green candidate Hannah Bell wins the by-election to fill the seat of Charlottetown-Parkdale, doubling the Green caucus to two and becoming the first time in PEI politics, that a provincial third-party won a by-election.

2018
31 January – MLA for West Royalty-Springvale Bush Dumville leaves the Liberal Party, becomes an independent.
14 February – Anticipating an early General Election, the Greens call for potential candidates "to make themselves known".
7 April – Joe Byrne is elected leader of the New Democratic Party of Prince Edward Island.
13 June – The Electoral System Referendum Act is passed by the Legislative Assembly, scheduling a referendum on electoral reform for the same date as the provincial election. Voters will be asked if they support Prince Edward Island changing its electoral system to mixed-member proportional representation.
17 September – Progressive Conservative leader James Aylward announces pending resignation, to take effect upon selection of successor.

2019
1 February – Campaign period for the electoral reform referendum begins, making an election likely for the spring.
9 February – Dennis King is elected leader of the Progressive Conservative Party of Prince Edward Island.
26 March – Premier Wade MacLauchlan advises Lieutenant Governor Antoinette Perry to dissolve the legislature and call an early election.
20 April – The election in the riding of Charlottetown-Hillsborough Park is formally delayed as a result of the death of Green Party candidate Josh Underhay.
23 April – General election held.
13 June – Deferred election date announced for Charlottetown-Hillsborough Park.
6 July – Advance voting in Charlottetown-Hillsborough Park deferred election began, also took place on 8 and 12 July.
15 July – Charlottetown-Hillsborough Park deferred election held, Progressive Conservative candidate Natalie Jameson is elected.

Opinion polls

The following is a list of scientific opinion polls of published voter intentions.

Candidates

Party leaders' names are in bold; cabinet ministers' names are in italics.
Incumbents not running for re-election are denoted with a dagger †.

Cardigan

|-
|bgcolor="whitesmoke"|4. Belfast-Murray River
|
|Ian MacPherson615 - 20.91%
|| 
|Darlene Compton1,545 - 52.53%
|
|James Sanders781 - 26.56%
|
|
|
|
|| 
|Darlene Compton
|-
|bgcolor="whitesmoke"|2. Georgetown-Pownal
|
|Kevin Doyle663 - 21.60%
|| 
|Steven Myers1,493 - 48.63%
|
|Susan Hartley865 - 28.18%
|
|Edith Perry49 - 1.60%
|
|
|| 
|Steven Myers Georgetown-St. Peters
|-
|bgcolor="whitesmoke"|5. Mermaid-Stratford
|
|Randy Cooper902 - 29.81%
|
|Mary Ellen McInnis934 - 30.87%
|| 
|Michele Beaton1,152 - 38.07%
|
|Lawrence Millar38 - 1.26%
|
|
||
|Alan McIsaac†Vernon River-Stratford
|-
|bgcolor="whitesmoke"|3. Montague-Kilmuir
|
|Daphne Griffin785 -26.55%
|| 
|Cory Deagle1,373 - 46.43%
|
|John Allen MacLean675 - 22.83%
|
|Billy Cann124 - 4.19%
|
|
|| 
|Allen Roach†
|-
|bgcolor="whitesmoke"|7. Morell-Donagh
|
|Susan Myers557 - 18.32%
|| 
|Sidney MacEwen1,752 - 57.61%
|
|Kyle MacDonald697 - 22.92%
|
|Margaret Andrade35 - 1.15%
|
|
|| 
|Sidney MacEwen Morell-Mermaid
|-
|bgcolor="whitesmoke"|1. Souris-Elmira
|
|Tommy Kickham861 - 28.59%
|| 
|Colin LaVie1,347 - 44.72%
|
|Boyd Leard804 - 26.69%
|
|
|
|
||
|Colin LaVie
|-
|bgcolor="whitesmoke"|8. Stanhope-Marshfield
|
|Wade MacLauchlan 1,196 - 36.36%
|| 
|Bloyce Thompson1,300 - 39.53%
|
|Sarah Donald747 - 22.71%
|
|Marian White46 - 1.40%
|
|
||
|Wade MacLauchlan York-Oyster Bed
|-
|bgcolor="whitesmoke"|6. Stratford-Keppoch
|
|David Dunphy882 - 29.52%
|| 
|James Aylward1,270 - 42.50%
|
|Devon Strang805 - 26.94%
|
|Lynne Thiele31 - 1.04%
|
|
||
|James Aylward Stratford-Kinlock
|}

Malpeque

|-
|bgcolor="whitesmoke"|19. Borden-Kinkora
|
|Jamie Stride417 - 12.93%
|| 
|Jamie Fox1,680 - 52.11%
|
|Matthew MacFarlane1,041 - 32.29%
|
|Joan Gauvin32 - 0.99%
|
|Fred McCardle54 - 1.67%
||
|Jamie Fox
|-
|bgcolor="whitesmoke"|15. Brackley-Hunter River
|
|Windsor Wight899 - 28.54%
|| 
|Dennis King1,315 - 41.75%
|
|Greg Bradley879 - 27.90%
|
|Leah-Jane Hayward57 - 1.81%
|
|
||
|Bush Dumville West Royalty-Springvale
|-
|bgcolor="whitesmoke"|16. Cornwall-Meadowbank
|| 
|Heath MacDonald1,643 - 47.90%
|
|Elaine Barnes602 - 17.55%
|
|Ellen Jones1,137 - 33.15%
|
|Craig Nash48 - 1.40%
|
|
||
|Heath MacDonald
|-
|bgcolor="whitesmoke"|20. Kensington-Malpeque
|
|Nancy Beth Guptill389 - 12.03%
|| 
|Matthew MacKay2,008 - 62.11%
|
|Matthew J. MacKay805 - 24.90%
|
|Carole MacFarlane31 - 0.96%
|
|
||
|Matthew MacKay
|-
|bgcolor="whitesmoke"|17. New Haven-Rocky Point
|
|Judy MacNevin515 - 14.80%
|
|Kris Currie1,068 - 30.70%
|| 
|Peter Bevan-Baker1,870 - 53.75%
|
|
|
|Don Wills26 - 0.75%
||
|Peter Bevan-Baker Kellys Cross-Cumberland
|-
|bgcolor="whitesmoke"|18. Rustico-Emerald
|
|Alexander (Sandy) MacKay489 - 14.65%
|| 
|Brad Trivers1,920 - 57.52%
|
|Colin Jeffrey899 - 26.93%
|
|Sean Deagle30 - 0.90%
|
|
||
|Brad Trivers
|}

Charlottetown

|-
|bgcolor="whitesmoke"|11. Charlottetown-Belvedere
|
|Roxanne Carter-Thompson846 - 26.56%
|
|Ronnie Carragher998 - 31.33%
|| 
|Hannah Bell1,286 - 40.38%
|
|Trevor Leclerc55 - 1.73%
|
|
|| 
|Hannah Bell Charlottetown-Parkdale
|-
|bgcolor="whitesmoke"|13. Charlottetown-Brighton
|
|Jordan Brown1,223 - 37.88%
|
|Donna Hurry567 - 17.56%
|| 
|Ole Hammarlund1,301 - 40.29%
|
|Simone Webster138 - 4.27%
|
|
||
|Jordan Brown
|-
|rowspan=2 bgcolor="whitesmoke"|9. Charlottetown-Hillsborough Park
|
|Karen Lavers635 25.71%
|| 
|Natalie Jameson1,080 43.72%
|
|John Andrew709 - 28.70%
|
|Gordon Gay46 - 1.86%
|
|
|rowspan=2 |
|rowspan=2|Buck Watts† Tracadie-Hillsborough Park
|-
|colspan=10 align="center"|Election deferred, held on 15 July 2019 due to the death of Green Party candidate Josh Underhay
|-
|bgcolor="whitesmoke"|12. Charlottetown-Victoria Park
|
|Richard Brown875 - 27.86%
|
|Tim Keizer656 - 20.89%
|| 
|Karla Bernard1,272 - 40.50%
|
|Joe Byrne338 - 10.76%
|
|
|| 
|Richard Brown
|-
|bgcolor="whitesmoke"|14. Charlottetown-West Royalty
|| 
|Gord McNeilly1,079 - 35.16%
|
|Angus Birt766 - 24.96%
|
|Gavin Hall966 - 31.48%
|
|Janis Newman56 - 1.82%
|
|Bush Dumville202 - 6.58%
|| 
|Kathleen Casey†Charlottetown-Lewis Point
|-
|bgcolor="whitesmoke"|10. Charlottetown-Winsloe
|| 
|Robert Mitchell1,420 - 41.97%
|
|Mike Gillis865 - 25.57%
|
|Amanda Morrison1,057 - 31.24%
|
|Jesse Reddin Cousins41 - 1.21%
|
|
|| 
|Robert Mitchell Charlottetown-Sherwood
|}

Egmont

|-
|bgcolor="whitesmoke"|26. Alberton-Bloomfield
|
|Pat Murphy1,153 - 40.02%
|| 
|Ernie Hudson1,312 - 45.54%
|
|James McKenna317 - 11.00%
|
|Michelle Arsenault99 - 3.44%
|| 
|Pat Murphy Alberton-Roseville
|-
|bgcolor="whitesmoke"|24. Evangeline-Miscouche
|| 
|Sonny Gallant1,100 - 44.55%
|
|Jason Woodbury575 - 23.29%
|
|Nick Arsenault761 - 30.82%
|
|Grant Gallant33 - 1.34%
|| 
|Sonny Gallant
|-
|bgcolor="whitesmoke"|25. O'Leary-Inverness
|| 
|Robert Henderson1,102 - 40.92%
|
|Barb Broome462 - 17.16%
|
|Jason Charette231 - 8.58%
|
|Herb Dickieson898 - 33.35%
|| 
|Robert Henderson
|-
|bgcolor="whitesmoke"|22. Summerside-South Drive
|
|Tina Mundy938 - 31.61%
|
|Paul Walsh662 - 22.31%
|| 
|Steve Howard1,302 - 43.88%
|
|Garth Oatway65 - 2.19%
|| 
|Tina Mundy Summerside-St. Eleanors
|-
|bgcolor="whitesmoke"|21. Summerside-Wilmot
|
|Chris Palmer892 - 27.65%
|
|Tyler DesRoches1,037 - 32.15%
|| 
|Lynne Lund1,258 - 39.00%
|
|Paulette Halupa39 - 1.21%
|| 
|Chris Palmer
|-
|bgcolor="whitesmoke"|27. Tignish-Palmer Road
|| 
|Hal Perry1,388 - 49.25%
|
|Melissa Handrahan802 - 28.46%
|
|Sean Doyle584 - 20.72%
|
|Dale Ryan44 - 1.56%
|| 
|Hal Perry
|-
|bgcolor="whitesmoke"|23. Tyne Valley-Sherbrooke
|
|Paula Biggar882 - 28.54%
|
|Hilton MacLennan1,026 - 33.20%
|| 
|Trish Altass1,101 - 35.63%
|
|Robin Enman81 - 2.62%
|| 
|Paula Biggar Tyne Valley-Linkletter
|}

Notes

References

Further reading

 

2019 elections in Canada
2019 in Prince Edward Island
Elections in Prince Edward Island